The 2008–09 season was the fourth season for the Newcastle Jets, and the first as defending champions.

Players

First team squad

Transfers
In
 Sean Rooney from Sydney FC
 Justin Pasfield from Wollongong Wolves
 Daniel Piorkowski from Walsall FC
 Jason Naidovski from AIS
 Shaun Ontong from Adelaide United
 Kaz Patafta from S.L. Benfica
 Antun Kovacic from Richmond SC
 Jesper Håkansson from Lyngby BK
 Edmundo Zura from Imbabura SC (loan)

Out
 Stephen Laybutt, Contract Not Renewed
 Denni, Contract Not Renewed
 Andrew Durante, to Wellington Phoenix
 Mark Bridge, to  Sydney FC
 Paul Kohler, Released
 Stuart Musialik, to Sydney FC
 Troy Hearfield, to Wellington Phoenix
 Scott Tunbridge, Released

Triallists
The following players trialled with the Jets but were unsuccessful in gaining a contract.
 Jarrad Ross
 Mark Byrnes
 Yanni Galanos
 Valerio Mastrelli
 Simone Bracalello
 Severin Brice Bikoko (could not obtain Visa)
 Joe Keenan (signed for Hibernian instead)
 Ali Abbas
 Ali Khader
 Andre Gumprecht (returned to the Mariners)

Matches

2008 Pre Season Cup

Group A

2008–09 Hyundai A-League fixtures

League table

Statistics

Goal scorers
Last updated 26 January 2009

Discipline
Last updated 26 January 2009

2009 AFC Champions League
The Newcastle Jets qualified for the 2009 edition of the Asian Champions League after defeating Central Coast Mariners to be crowned 2007–08 Champions.

Champions League squad

 

 *Departed part way through the group stage.

On Loan
 Joel Griffiths – From Beijing Guoan until December 2009

Transfers

Group E table

Fixtures

Other squads

Youth squad

Women's squad

References

2008-09
2008–09 A-League season by team